Demiricous is a death/thrash metal band from Indianapolis, Indiana formed by Nate Olp, Scott Wilson, Ben Parrish (of Upheaval), and Christopher Cruz. In 2005, they self-released a demo which caught the attention of Metal Blade. After the release of their first album, Christopher Cruz left the band and was later replaced by Dustin Boltjes. In 2008, Scott Bronner (MercyKill, Legion) joined the band, replacing Scott Wilson, and Mike Morgan (Summon The Destroyer, Christ Beheaded) replaced Ben Parrish.  But, after a long hiatus, Scott Wilson and Ben Parrish returned and recorded their 3rd full length, III: Chaotic Lethal.  The album was released in May 2022.  

Their debut album, One (Hellbound) was recorded and mixed at Planet-Z Studios with Zeuss (Hatebreed, The Red Chord, Shadows Fall) in June 2005 and released later that year. Following this the band set out on a tour with Himsa in late 2006.

It has also been stated that the band's name, Demiricous, has no significant meaning at all and is just a made-up word. The band has already gained a worldwide fanbase with their debut album, and has earned the respect and praise of metal icons Slayer.

Their follow-up album, Two (Poverty), was released in 2007 by Metal Blade Records.

The band is also featured on the bonus disc of Byzantine's Salvation DVD, in a segment entitled "Shoe Fight", which was filmed in September 2006 when the two bands were on tour together.

On February 2, 2022, the band announced that their third album would be titled III: Chaotic Lethal. It was released on May 13, making it their first album in over 14 years.

Discography 
One (Hellbound) (2006)
Two (Poverty) (2007)
III: Chaotic Lethal (2022)

References

External links
https://demiricousofficial.bandcamp.com/ Demiricous Bandcamp
https://www.instagram.com/demiricous_official/ Demiricous Instagram

Musical groups established in 2001
Heavy metal musical groups from Indiana
American death metal musical groups
American thrash metal musical groups
Musical groups from Indianapolis
Musical quartets
Metal Blade Records artists